Pseudanarta singula is a moth of the family Noctuidae. It is in the south-western parts of the United States, including Texas, California and Utah.

The wingspan is about 27 mm.

External links
Images

Xyleninae
Moths described in 1880